Spotsylvania County is a county in the U.S. state of Virginia. As of the July 2021 estimate, the population was 143,676. Its county seat is Spotsylvania Courthouse.

History
At the time of European encounter, the inhabitants of the area that became Spotsylvania County were a Siouan-speaking tribe called the Manahoac.

As the colonial population increased, Spotsylvania County was established in 1721 from parts of Essex, King and Queen, and King William counties. The county was named in Latin for Lieutenant Governor of Virginia Alexander Spotswood who incidentally was also the second greatgrandfather of Robert E Lee.

Many major battles were fought in this county during the Civil War, including the Battle of Chancellorsville, Battle of the Wilderness, Battle of Fredericksburg, and Battle of Spotsylvania Court House. The war resulted in widespread disruption and opportunity: some 10,000 African-American slaves left area plantations and city households to cross the Rappahannock River, reaching the Union lines and gaining freedom. This exodus is commemorated by historical markers on both sides of the river.

General Stonewall Jackson was shot and mortally wounded by friendly fire in Spotsylvania County during the Battle of Chancellorsville. A group of Confederate soldiers from North Carolina were in the woods and heard General Jackson's party returning from reconnoitering the Union lines. They mistook them for a Federal patrol and fired on them, wounding Jackson in both arms. His left arm was amputated. General Jackson died a few days later from pneumonia at nearby Guinea Station. He and other Confederate wounded were being gathered there for evacuation to hospitals to the south and further away from enemy lines.

Geography

It is bounded on the north by the Rappahannock and Rapidan rivers, the independent city of Fredericksburg (all of which were part of the area's early history), and the counties of Stafford and Culpeper; on the south by the North Anna River and its impoundment, Lake Anna, and by the counties of Hanover and Louisa; on the west by Orange County and Culpeper County; and on the east by Caroline County.

Adjacent counties and independent city
 Culpeper County, Virginia – north
 Stafford County, Virginia – northeast
 City of Fredericksburg, Virginia – northeast
 Caroline County, Virginia – southeast
 Hanover County, Virginia – south
 Louisa County, Virginia – southwest
 Orange County, Virginia – west and northwest

National protected area
 Fredericksburg and Spotsylvania National Military Park (part)

Points of interest 
 Lake Anna State Park
 Spotsylvania County Public Schools
 Spotsylvania Courthouse
 Fredericksburg and Spotsylvania National Military Park
 Spotsylvania Towne Centre
 Spotsylvania County Sheriff’s Office
 Central Rappahannock Regional Library
 Dominion Raceway

Communities 
There are no incorporated towns or cities in Spotsylvania County. Unincorporated communities in the county include:

Census-designated places 
 Lake Wilderness
 Spotsylvania Courthouse

Other unincorporated communities 

 Alsop
 Arcadia
 Artillery Ridge
 Bells Crossroad
 Belmont
 Blades Corner
 Brandon
 Brockroad
 Brokenburg
 Carters Store
 Chancellor
 Chancellor Green, a local Hispanic enclave
 Chancellorsville
 Chewnings Corner
 Cookstown
 Cosner's Corner
 Dunavant
 Five Mile Fork
 Four Mile Fork
 Granite Springs
 Lanes Corner
 Leavells
 Lewiston
 Margo
 Marye
 Massaponax
 McHenry
 Old Trap
 Olivers Corner
 Partlow
 Paytes
 Post Oak
 Shady Grove Corner
 Snell
 Stubbs
 Thornburg
 Todds Tavern

Many areas of the county have Fredericksburg addresses.

Major highways

Governance

County government
Spotsylvania County's highest level of management is that of County Administrator. This post oversees all county departments and agencies and serves as the Spotsylvania County's Board of Supervisors' liaison to state and regional agencies.

Board of Supervisors
Spotsylvania is governed by a Board of Supervisors. The board consists of seven members (one from each district within the county). The Board of Supervisors sets county policies, adopts ordinances, appropriates funds, approves land rezoning and special exceptions to the zoning ordinance, and carries out other responsibilities set forth by the county code.

The following is the current list of supervisors and districts which they represent:

State representation

Federal representation
Spotsylvania residents are represented by either Abigail Spanberger (D-7th District) or Rob Wittman (R-1st District) in the House of Representatives. The current U.S. senators from the Commonwealth of Virginia are Mark Warner (D) and Tim Kaine (D).

Demographics

2020 census

Note: the US Census treats Hispanic/Latino as an ethnic category. This table excludes Latinos from the racial categories and assigns them to a separate category. Hispanics/Latinos can be of any race.

2010 census
As of the census of 2010, there were 122,397 people, 31,308 households, and 24,639 families residing in the county. There were 33,329 housing units at an average density of 83 per square mile (32/km2). The racial makeup of the county was:
 78.4% White
 15.8% Black or African American
 0.4% Native American
 2.4% Asian
 0.05% Pacific Islander
 2.8% from other races, and
 1.88% from two or more races.

7.8% of the population were Hispanic or Latino of any race.

There were 31,308 households, out of which 42.40% had children under the age of 18 living with them, 64.80% were married couples living together, 9.90% had a female householder with no husband present, and 21.30% were non-families. 16.40% of all households were made up of individuals, and 5.40% had someone living alone who was 65 years of age or older. The average household size was 2.87 and the average family size was 3.22.

In the county, the population was spread out, with 30.00% under the age of 18, 7.30% from 18 to 24, 32.20% from 25 to 44, 22.20% from 45 to 64, and 8.30% who were 65 years of age or older. The median age was 34 years. For every 100 females, there were 97.10 males. For every 100 females age 18 and over, there were 93.00 males.

The 2021 median income for a household in the county was $98,973 compared to $69,021 for the United States; the median income for a family was $87,922. Males had a median income of $49,166 versus $38,076 for females. The per capita income for the county was $37,212. 6.6% of the population lives below the poverty line, including 6.70% of those under age 18 and 5.20% of those age 65 or over.

Infrastructure

Emergency services 
Fire and rescue services in Spotsylvania County are provided by a combination of career and volunteer organizations. The career staff of the Department of Fire, Rescue, and Emergency Management provide fire and rescue services 24/7/365 at all 11 stations, 1 (Courthouse), 2 (Brokenburg), 3 (Partlow),  4 (Four Mile Fork), 5 (Chancellor), 6 (Salem Church), 7 (Wilderness), 8 (Thornburg), 9 (Belmont), 10 (Salem Fields), 11 (Crossroads). Volunteers provide additional staffing nights and weekends at Stations 1, 2, 4, and 8. The volunteer organizations include The Spotsylvania Volunteer Fire Department, and The Spotsylvania Volunteer Rescue Squad.

Education

Public schools

Private schools
 Fredericksburg Academy
 Fredericksburg Christian School
 The Summit Academy
 Odyssey Montessori School
 Saint Patrick School
 Saint Michael the Archangel High School
 Faith Baptist Christian School
 Mount Hope Academy

Colleges and universities
Germanna Community College is part of the Virginia Community College System and serves the City of Fredericksburg, and the counties of Stafford, Spotsylvania, Orange, Culpeper, and King George.

The University of Mary Washington located in neighboring Fredericksburg, Virginia, is a four-year university and graduate school that also serves the area.

Notable people
 Thomas Dickens Arnold, United States Congressman from Virginia
 Francis Asbury (1745–1816), one of the first two bishops of the Methodist Episcopal Church
 Caressa Cameron,  Miss Virginia 2009 and Miss America 2010
 Elijah Craig, Baptist minister arrested in Fredericksburg for preaching without a license from the Anglican Church before the American Revolution
 Evelyn Magruder DeJarnette (1842–1914), author
 Joe Gibbs, former Washington Redskins coach
 Rahman "Rock" Harper, chef, television personality, and restaurateur
 Alexander Holladay (1811–1877), U. S. Representative
 Kunta Kinte, a.k.a. Toby Waller (1750–1822), character in novel Roots: The Saga of an American Family and television miniseries Roots
 John Maine, pitcher for the New York Mets
 Danny McBride, actor
 Phil Short, former member of the Louisiana State Senate and United States Marine Corps officer
 Matthew Fontaine Maury, father of modern oceanography

See also
 National Register of Historic Places listings in Spotsylvania County, Virginia

References

External links

 Spotsylvania County Official Website
 Spotsylvania County Department of Economic Development
 Spotsylvania County Public Schools
 Fredericksburg.com, site of The Free Lance-Star
 Spotsylvania County Virginia Zip Codes
 Spotsylvania County Sheriff's Office

 
Virginia counties
Northern Virginia counties
Washington metropolitan area
1721 establishments in Virginia
Populated places established in 1721